Myricks Airport,  in Berkley, Massachusetts, is an historic, public airport owned by the Myricks Airfield Foundation.  It has one turf runway (9/27), averages 59 flights per week, and has approximately 2 aircraft based on its field.

References

External links
 Myricks Airport Foundation website

Airports in Bristol County, Massachusetts